The Heath Farm Camp  Archeological Site is an archeological site located near Elkton, Cecil County, Maryland.  The site is one of a group of interrelated sites illustrating the various phases of stone tool production and living area activities.

It was listed on the National Register of Historic Places in 1983.

References

External links
, at Maryland Historical Trust website

Archaic period in North America
Archaeological sites in Cecil County, Maryland
Archaeological sites on the National Register of Historic Places in Maryland
Native American history of Maryland
National Register of Historic Places in Cecil County, Maryland